The 2009-10 Memphis Grizzlies season was the 15th season of the franchise in the National Basketball Association (NBA).

During the offseason the Grizzlies acquired Allen Iverson, but his stint in Memphis lasted only three games and he left the team due to personal reasons. Iverson then returned to the team where he began his career, the Philadelphia 76ers in December.

Key dates
June 25 - The 2009 NBA Draft took place in New York City.
July 8 - The free agency period started.

Draft picks

Roster

Regular season

Standings

Record vs. opponents

Player statistics

Regular season 

|-
| 
| 32 || 1 || 14.3 || .432 || .000 || .567 || 3.4 || .5 || .4 || .4 || 4.5
|-
| 
| 5 || 0 || 16.0 || .231 || . || .800 || 1.4 || .6 || 1.2 || .0 || 2.0
|-
| 
| 71 || 1 || 11.2 || .396 || .000 || .623 || 2.1 || .5 || .4 || .1 || 2.9
|-
| 
| 80 || 80 || 32.1 || .445 || .387 || .743 || 2.4 || style=";"| 5.3 || 1.4 || .2 || 12.0
|-
| 
| 69 || 69 || 35.8 || .581 || .000 || .670 || 9.3 || 2.4 || 1.0 || style=";"| 1.6 || 14.6
|-
| 
| 80 || 80 || style=";"| 39.7 || .466 || .327 || .753 || 5.9 || 1.9 || style=";"| 1.5 || .8 || 19.6
|-
| 
| 2 || 0 || 2.5 || style=";"| 1.000 || . || . || .5 || .0 || .5 || .0 || 1.0
|-
| 
| 36 || 0 || 6.7 || .387 || .000 || .737 || 2.1 || .3 || .0 || .4 || 1.7
|-
| 
| 9 || 0 || 6.8 || .400 || .182 || style=";"| .857 || 1.1 || .6 || .6 || .1 || 4.0
|-
| 
| 21 || 0 || 7.5 || .395 || . || .528 || 2.0 || .0 || .0 || .5 || 2.5
|-
| 
| 3 || 0 || 22.3 || .577 || style=";"| 1.000 || .500 || 1.3 || 3.7 || .3 || .0 || 12.3
|-
| 
| style=";"| 82 || style=";"| 82 || 38.0 || .458 || .383 || .809 || 3.8 || 3.0 || 1.2 || .2 || 17.5
|-
| 
| 81 || 81 || 37.7 || .488 || .288 || .778 || style=";"| 11.7 || 1.8 || 1.0 || .4 || style=";"| 20.8
|-
| 
| 68 || 13 || 13.0 || .588 || . || .581 || 3.6 || .2 || .2 || 1.3 || 3.1
|-
| 
| 38 || 1 || 15.5 || .371 || .179 || .815 || 1.7 || 2.8 || .9 || .1 || 3.5
|-
| 
| 62 || 1 || 14.1 || .384 || .296 || .673 || 1.5 || 2.6 || .5 || .0 || 4.3
|-
| 
| 80 || 2 || 16.5 || .451 || .196 || .777 || 2.5 || .7 || .4 || .3 || 7.4
|}

Awards, records and milestones

Awards

Week/Month
Lionel Hollins - Western Conference Coach of the Month: December

All-Star
Zach Randolph was selected as a Western All-star reserve. (1st appearance)

Season

Records

Milestones

Injuries and surgeries

Transactions

Trades

Free agents

Additions

Subtractions

References

External links
2009–10 Memphis Grizzlies season at ESPN
2009–10 Memphis Grizzlies season at Basketball Reference

Memphis Grizzlies seasons
Memphis
Memphis Grizzlies
Memphis Grizzlies
Events in Memphis, Tennessee